The 1968 United States presidential election in Hawaii took place on November 5, 1968. All 50 states and the District of Columbia, were part of the 1968 United States presidential election. Hawaii voters chose 4 electors to the Electoral College, which selected the president and vice president.

Hawaii overwhelmingly voted for the Democratic Party nominee Vice President Hubert Humphrey of Minnesota with Edmund Muskie  against Republican Party candidate, former Vice President Richard Nixon of New York with Spiro Agnew. Hawaii weighed in for this election as 22% more Democratic than the national average, with Humphrey winning the state by a 21% margin.

Ironically, Hawaii, the United States' southernmost state, would prove to be the weakest state for the American Independent Party candidate, former Alabama governor George Wallace, who won 3,469 votes, amounting to a total of 1.47%. Being the only state in the country to have a plurality of non-white residents, mainly Asian Americans and Pacific Islanders, Wallace's strong segregationist views failed to make any significant impact on the state's electorate, especially since he was far beyond his base of support in the Deep South.

Results

See also
 Presidency of Richard Nixon

References

Hawaii
1968
1968 Hawaii elections